Kabbala  is a small village in the Chitradurga district of the Karnataka state of India located in the southern part of Karnataka.

References

Villages in Chitradurga district